Werly Fairburn (November 27, 1924 – January 18, 1985) was an American rockabilly musician.

Fairburn was born near Folsom, Louisiana. In his youth, he listened to the Grand Ole Opry and old-time music ("hillbilly music") on the radio. He learned to play guitar from an old, local blues musician. When World War II began, he took a job at a New Orleans shipyard before enlisting in the U.S. Navy in Hawaii. When he returned to New Orleans, he considered a singing career, but to make a living he learned how to cut hair. In 1948 he became known as the "Singing Barber" when he broadcast on WJBW from his barber shop.

In March 1955, Werly joined the cast of the Louisiana Hayride in Shreveport, where he performed alongside Elvis Presley, Johnny Cash, Bob Luman, David Houston and other early rockabilly stylists.  Werly remained with the Hayride through the end of 1957.  His first album appeared on Trumpet Records in the 1950s. Over the years he recorded for Columbia, Capitol, and Savoy. Fairburn also owned a label called Milestone Records in the 1950s and 1960s. Fairburn's music blended country, blues, and New Orleans rhythm and blues (R&B). He was popular in New Orleans and in Dallas, where he performed on the Big D Jamboree. His song "I Guess I'm Crazy" was covered by Jim Reeves. His 1956 single "Everybody's Rockin'" is considered a rockabilly classic. Fairburn moved to California in the 1960s and performed until his death in 1985.

Discography

Notes
All singles before Milestone 2013 were issued as 78 rpm and 45 rpm records with the same issue numbers. Milestone 2013 and on are 45 rpm only issues. UK record collector Matthew Duncan provided information for this article, having referred to Barry John's Rockabilly Price Guide for 45 rpm records and vintage recordings from his collection.

References

American rockabilly musicians
American country singer-songwriters
Singer-songwriters from Louisiana
Deaths from lung cancer
People from St. Tammany Parish, Louisiana
Barbers
1924 births
1985 deaths
20th-century American singers
Country musicians from Louisiana
Trumpet Records artists